Kristof Vliegen (born 22 June 1982) is a Belgian former  tennis player. He plays right-handed and he turned professional in 2001.

He was a semi-finalist in Chennai in 2006 and in May of the same year, he reached the final of the ATP tournament in Munich, setting up the first all-Belgian men's singles final against Olivier Rochus.

2009

In Doha, the first tournament of the year he defeated Spaniard Óscar Hernández with 6–1, 6–7 and 6–7. In the next round he faced German Philipp Kohlschreiber. He was defeated in three straight sets 4–6, 7–6 and 6–4. At the Australian open he met Italian Simone Bolelli but lost in three long sets 6–7, 5–7 and 6–7. One week later he started in the SA Tennis Open as the seventh seed. In the first round he won in two straight sets of unranked Ross Hutchins. In the next round he defeated Czech Jan Minář. In the quarterfinals he lost to world number 6 Jo-Wilfried Tsonga in straight sets 4–6 and 1–6. At the Open 13 in Marseille he faced Czech Jan Hernych in the first round but lost in three sets: 6–3, 3–6 and 6–4.

2006
He was a semi-finalist in Chennai in 2006 and in May of the same year, he reached the final of the ATP tournament in Munich, setting up the first all-Belgian men's singles final against Olivier Rochus. He was also the 30th seed at the 2006 Wimbledon Championships, where he reached the 2nd round before losing to Nicolas Mahut in straight sets.

ATP career finals

Singles: 2 (2 runner-ups)

Doubles: 2 (2 runner-ups)

ATP Challenger and ITF Futures finals

Singles: 16 (11–5)

Doubles: 10 (7–3)

Junior Grand Slam finals

Doubles: 1 (1 title)

Performance timelines

Singles

Doubles

External links 

 
 
 
 Vliegen World ranking history

Belgian male tennis players
Sportspeople from Limburg (Belgium)
1982 births
Living people
Wimbledon junior champions
Grand Slam (tennis) champions in boys' doubles